Esther Guerrero Puigdevall (born 7 February 1990) is a Spanish middle-distance runner competing primarily in the 800 metres. She won two medals for the mixed relay at the European Cross Country Championships.

Guerrero represented her country at the 2016 Rio and 2020 Tokyo Olympics. She is the Spanish record holder for the 2000 metres and the indoor mile. She won multiple national titles.

Statistics

Personal bests
 800 metres – 1:59.22 (Doha 2020)
 800 metres indoor – 2:01.13 (Madrid 2021)
 1000 metres – 2:35.64 (Brussels 2020)
 1000 metres indoor – 2:38.81 (Birmingham 2022)
 1500 metres – 4:02.41 (Stockholm 2021)
 1500 metres indoor – 4:04.86 (Istanbul 2023)
 One mile – 4:22.81 (Brussels 2021)
 One mile indoor – 4:24.92 (Boston, MA 2023) 
 2000 metres – 5:41.30 (Olot 2020) 
 3000 metres indoor – 8:56.61 (Manchester 2022)

International competitions

National titles
 Spanish Athletics Championships
 800 metres: 2015, 2016, 2017, 2020
 1500 metres: 2019, 2020, 2021
 Spanish Indoor Athletics Championships
 800 metres: 2015, 2016, 2017, 2018
 1500 metres: 2019, 2020, 2021, 2023

References

External links
 
 
 
 
 

1990 births
Living people
Athletes from Catalonia
Spanish female middle-distance runners
People from Pla de l'Estany
Sportspeople from the Province of Girona
World Athletics Championships athletes for Spain
Athletes (track and field) at the 2016 Summer Olympics
Athletes (track and field) at the 2020 Summer Olympics
Olympic athletes of Spain
Spanish Athletics Championships winners
Athletes (track and field) at the 2018 Mediterranean Games
Ibero-American Championships in Athletics winners
Mediterranean Games competitors for Spain
21st-century Spanish women